This is a list of Polish football transfers in the 2018 summer transfer window by club. Only clubs in the 2018–19 Ekstraklasa are included.

Ekstraklasa

Arka Gdynia

In:

Out:

Cracovia

In:

Out:

Górnik Zabrze

In:

Out:

Jagiellonia Białystok

In:

Out:

Korona Kielce

In:

Out:

Lech Poznań

In:

Out:

Lechia Gdańsk

In:

Out:

Legia Warsaw

In:

Out:

Miedź Legnica

In:

Out:

Piast Gliwice

In:

Out:

Pogoń Szczecin

In:

Out:

Śląsk Wrocław

In:

Out:

Wisła Kraków

In:

Out:

Wisła Płock

In:

Out:

Zagłębie Lubin

In:

Out:

Zagłębie Sosnowiec

In:

Out:

References

Transfers
Poland
2018
Transfers